Cornelius M. Brosnan (1813 – April 21, 1867) was a justice of the Supreme Court of Nevada from 1864 until shortly before his death in 1867.

Born in County Kerry, Ireland, he entered Maynooth University at the age of fourteen, and remained there for four years. In 1831, at the age of 18, Brosnan emigrated to the United States to work as a science teacher, and in 1851 he moved to San Francisco, California. He moved to Virginia City, Nevada, in 1863, where he served in the convention that drew up the constitution of the state for its admission to statehood the following year. Brosnan was then elected to the Nevada Supreme Court, where he served until 1867, when he returned to California, remaining there until his death that same year in Santa Clara County, California.

References

1813 births
1867 deaths
People from County Kerry
Alumni of Maynooth University
Justices of the Nevada Supreme Court
Irish emigrants to the United States (before 1923)